Robin Maxwell may refer to:

Robin Maxwell (author) (born 1948), American author of historical fiction
Robin Maxwell-Hyslop (1931–2010), British Conservative Politician
Robin Maxwell, fictional character in the science fiction series V